The 1996–97 season of the NOFV-Oberliga was the third season of the league at tier four (IV) of the German football league system.

The NOFV-Oberliga was split into two divisions, NOFV-Oberliga Nord and NOFV-Oberliga Süd. The champions of each, SV Babelsberg 03 and 1. FC Magdeburg, as well as F.C. Hansa Rostock II, were directly promoted to the 1997–98 Regionalliga Nordost.

1. FC Schwedt went into administration soon after the season began and withdrew from the league.

North

South

External links 
 NOFV-Online – official website of the North-East German Football Association 

NOFV-Oberliga seasons
4
Germ